Yevgeniy Lebedev (born 19 February 1981) is a Russian sprinter who specializes in the 400 metres.

Lebedev won the bronze medal in 4 × 400 metres relay at the 2006 World Indoor Championships, together with teammates Konstantin Svechkar, Aleksandr Derevyagin and Dmitriy Petrov. Previously Lebedev had finished seventh in the same event at the 2005 World Championships.

His personal best time is 45.77 seconds, achieved in July 2005 in Tula.

References

1981 births
Living people
Russian male sprinters
World Athletics Indoor Championships medalists
21st-century Russian people